Willis is a surname of English, Norman French, and Scottish origin. The oldest extant family of the name, the Willes family of Warwickshire, formerly of Newbold Comyn and Fenny Compton, has used the spellings 'Willis,' 'Willys,' and 'Wyllys' and appear in records from 1330. In this case, the name derives from the name de Welles (under which name the family were Lincolnshire noblemen) which comes from the Norman name de Vallibus (meaning 'of the valley'), which in turn was derived from the Vaux family tree. The Vaux family, established in England by Harold de Vaux, a close relative of William the Conqueror, appears in French records from 794. They had held power in their own right and through royal intermarriages.

There are other derivations of the name, including, particularly in Scotland, 'son of William/ Will' (whereby the name has developed from 'Wills', and is similar to 'Wilson' and other related names); because of the popularity of the name 'William' since the Norman conquest, it is clear that by no means are all people with this surname- even very distantly- related.

Sources of the name notwithstanding, specific notable Willis families (aside from those in Warwickshire, aforementioned) were of: Halsnead, Lancashire (now in Whiston, Merseyside); Atherfield, on the Isle of Wight (and subsequently of an estate named after it at Woldingham, Surrey); and Monk's Barn, Petersfield, Hampshire. The Willis (later Willis Bund) family were of Wick, Worcestershire, a cadet branch of the Cambridgeshire family from which also came brothers Thomas and Richard Willis (also Willys), each created a baronet, both titles being extinct at the failure of their descendants by 1732. Humphrey Willis, Sheriff of County Donegal and County Fermanagh, was the ancestor of the Willis family of Florencecourt, County Fermanagh, later also of Monmouthshire, of which came the physician and foreign advisor to Japan, William Willis, and the writer Anthony Armstrong (born George Anthony Armstrong Willis); George Willis, who farmed at Florencecourt, discovered the Florencecourt Yew in 1767. Another Humphrey Willis, often conflated with the above Humphrey, was an English soldier and prominent English Civil War clubman, was of a yeomanry/ minor gentry family of Woolavington, Somerset, related on his mother's side to the Pophams of Huntworth.

Notable persons with this surname include:

A
Adam Willis (footballer) (born 1976), retired English footballer
Albert Charles Willis (1876–1954), Australian politician
Albert Sydney Willis (1843–1897), American politician
Alicia Leigh Willis (born 1978), American actress
Allee Willis (1947–2019), American songwriter
Arthur Willis (1920–1987), English footballer
Austin Willis (1917–2004), Canadian actor
A. M. "Monk" Willis, Jr. Achille Murat Willis, Jr. (1916–2011), Chairman, University of North Texas

B
Bailey Willis (1857–1949), American geologist
Beth Willis (producer) (born 1978), British television producer
Betty Willis (artist) (1923–2015), American artist and graphic designer
Betty Willis (singer) (1941–2018), American singer
Bill Willis (1921–2007), American footballer
Bob Willis (1949–2019), English cricketer
Bobby Willis (1942–1999), British songwriter
Browne Willis (1682–1760), English antiquarian and numismatist
Bruce Willis (born 1955), American actor

C
Cardis Cardell Willis (1937–2007), American comedian
Carl Willis (born 1960), American baseball player
Carl Willis (Australian sportsman) (1893–1930), Australian rules footballer
Carol Willis (disambiguation), several people
Charles Willis (disambiguation), several people
Chris Willis (born 1969), American singer
Christopher Willis (born 1978), Australian-British composer
Chuck Willis (1928–1958), American blues singer and songwriter
Connie Willis (born 1945), American science fiction writer
Craig Willis (born 1954), Australian sports announcer

D
Damion Willis (born 1997), American football player
Daria Willis, American academic administrator and historian
Dave Willis (born 1970), American voice actor
David Willis (disambiguation), several people
Deborah Willis (disambiguation), several people
Dinah Willis (born 1945), American model
Dixie Willis (born 1941), Australian middle distance runner
Donald Willis (born 1973), American football player
Don Willis (1909–1984), American pool hustler
Dontrelle Willis (born 1982), Major League pitcher for the Detroit Tigers

E
Eddie Willis (1936–2018), African-American musician
Edward Willis (disambiguation), several people
Edwin B. Willis (1893–1963), American film set designer
Edwin E. Willis (1904–1972), American politician
Elizabeth Willis (born 1961), American poet
Ellen Willis (1941–2006), American political essayist
Eric Willis (1922–1999), Australian politician
Errick Willis (1896–1967), Canadian politician

F
F. McGrew Willis (1891–1957), American screenwriter 
Felicity Willis (born 1978), Puerto Rican basketball player
Francis Willis (disambiguation), several people
Frank Willis (disambiguation), several people
Fred Willis (born 1947), retired American football player
 Sir Frederick Willis (British Army officer) (1827–1899), British Army general
Frederick Smythe Willis (1866–1910), Mayor of Willoughby, New South Wales

G
Gary Willis (born 1957), American musician
Geoff Willis (born 1959), Formula One Technical Director (Red Bull)
George Willis (disambiguation), several people
Gerald Willis (born 1995), American football player
Gerald Willis (politician) (1940–2015), American politician
Gerri Willis (born 1959), CNN news anchor
Gordon Willis (1931–2014), American cinematographer

H
Hal Willis (singer) (1933–2015), Canadian country singer
Harry Graham Willis (1875–1934), English colonial administrator
Henry Willis (disambiguation), several people
Henry Parker Willis (1874–1937), American finance expert
Humphrey Willis, 16th century Anglo-Irish soldier and sheriff of Counties Donegal and Fermanagh

I
Ike Willis (born 1955), American musician

J
James Willis (disambiguation), several people
Jason Willis (born 1980), American footballer
Jerome Willis (1928–2014), British stage and screen actor
Jim Willis (baseball) (born 1927), American baseball player
John Willis (disambiguation), several people
Jontavious Willis (born 1996), American country blues musician
Jordan Willis (American football) (born 1995), American football player
Judith Willis, American biologist

K
Katherine Willis (born 1971), American actress
Kelly Willis (born 1968), American country music singer/songwriter
Keith Willis (born 1959), American footballer
Ken Willis (born 1968), American footballer
Kevin Willis (born 1962), American professional basketball player
Khari Willis (born 1996), American football player

L
Larry Willis (1942–2019), American jazz pianist
Leo Willis (1890–1952), American actor
Leslie R. H. Willis (1908–1984), English engineer and archaeologist
Linda Willis (born 1949), witness during the assassination of President Kennedy

M
Malik Willis (born 1999), American football player
Marcus Willis (born 1990), British tennis player
Mark Willis (disambiguation), several people
Matt Willis (disambiguation), several people
Matthew Willis (disambiguation), several people
Meredith Sue Willis (born 1946), American writer
Michael Willis (born 1949), American actor
Michelle Willis (born 1986), American composer
Mike Willis (born 1950), American baseball player

N
Nathaniel Parker Willis (1806–1867), American author, poet and editor
Nick Willis (born 1983), New Zealand middle distance athlete
Norman Willis (1933–2014), British TYC General Secretary (1984–93)

P
Patrick Willis (born 1985), American footballer
Patrick Willis (judge) (born 1950), American judge
Paul Willis (disambiguation), several people
Payton Willis (born 1998), American basketball player in the Israeli Basketball Premier League
Peter Willis (disambiguation), several people
Phil Willis (born 1941), British politician
Phillip Willis (1918–1995), witnessed the assassination of President Kennedy
Patricia Willis, American novelist of Danger Along the Ohio

R
Ralph Willis (born 1938), Australian politician
Ralph Willis (blues musician) (c.1910–1957), American Piedmont blues and country blues singer, guitarist and songwriter
Ray Willis (born 1982), American footballer
Raymond E. Willis (1875–1956), US senator from Indiana
Rex Willis (1924–2000), Welsh rugby union player
Richard Storrs Willis (1818–1900), American composer
Richard Willis (spy) (1614–1690), English Civil War spy
Richard Gardiner Willis (1865–1929), Canadian politician
Richard Raymond Willis (1876–1968), English Victoria Cross recipient
Robert Willis (engineer) (1800–1875), English academic, engineer and writer on church architecture
Robert Willis (priest) (born 1947), dean of Canterbury
Robert Willis (diplomat) (1868–1921), English diplomat posted in China
Rosemary Willis (born 1953), witness to the assassination of President Kennedy
Rumer Willis (born 1968), American actress

S
Sam Willis (born 1977), British historian
Sarah Willis (author), American novelist
Shane Willis (born 1977), Canadian ice hockey player
Simon Willis (cricketer) (born 1974), English cricketer

T 
Ted Willis, Baron Willis (1914–1992), British television dramatist
Sir Thomas Willys, 1st Baronet (also 'Willis'); brother of Richard Willis (c. 1614–1701)
Thomas Willis (1621–1675), English doctor and founder of modern neurology
Tom Willis (footballer) (born 1983), Australian soccer player
Tom Willis (rugby union, born 1979), New Zealand rugby union player

V
Vic Willis (1875–1947), American Major League baseball player
Victor Willis (born 1951), American singer/songwriter

W
Walt Willis (1919–1999), Irish science fiction writer
Walter Willis (disambiguation), several people, including
Walter Michael Willis (1917–1941), American Navy ensign and namesake for the USS Willis
Walter Willis (director), American film director of A Pair of Hellions
Wesley Willis (1963–2003), Chicago artist and musician
William Nicholas Willis (1858–1922), Australian politician
William Willis (physician) (1837–1894), British physician
William Willis (traveller) (1897–1971), American sailor and adventurer
William Willis (inventor) (1841–1923), British inventor
William Willis (mayor) (1794–1870), American politician, Mayor of Portland, Maine
William J. Willis (1932–2012), American physicist
William Willis Garth (1828–1912), American politician
Wincey Willis (born 1948), weather forecaster on TV-am in Britain in the 1980s

References

English-language surnames
Surnames from given names